Roger Lion (27 September 1882 – 27 October 1934) was a French film director and screenwriter.

Filmographie 

 1912 : L'Agence Cacahouète
 1914 : La Petite Bretonne
 1915 : À qui la femme?
 1916 : Sacré Joseph
 1916 : L'Enlèvement de Vénus
 1916 : Dranem amoureux de Cléopâtre
 1916 : Français!... N'oubliez jamais!
 1916 : Erreur judiciaire
 1916 : Les Deux Gifles
 1917 : Quand Madelon
 1917 : Ma femme est folle
 1917 : Le Prince Plouf
 1918 : Pour faire plaisir
 1918 : La Flamme cachée
 1919 : Dagobert le fils à son père 
 1921 : L'Éternel féminin
 1923 : A Sereia de Pedra
 1923 : Les Yeux de l'âme (Os Olhos da Alma)
 1924 : La Fontaine des amours
 1924 : Aventuras de Agapito
 1924 : J'ai tué 
 1925 : La Clé de voûte
 1926 : Jim la houlette, roi des voleurs
 1926 : Les Fiançailles rouges
 1927 : The Porter from Maxim's (1927)
 1928 : La Venenosa
 1929 : Un soir au cocktail's bar
 1929 : L'Appel de la chair
 1929 : Amour de louve
 1930 : Messaoud Habib
 1930 : Marius à Paris
 1930 : La Raïs
 1930 : La place est bonne! 
 1930 : La Fille de Roland
 1930 : Grégor et ses Grégoriens (short film starring Grégor et ses Grégoriens)
 1930 : Eau, gaz et amour à tous les étages (short film)
 1930 : La nuit est à nous 
 1931 : Y'en a pas deux comme Angélique
 1931 : Le Lit conjugal (short film)
 1931 : Allô... Allô... (short film)
 1932 : Ghanili Dour (short film)
 1932 : Direct au cœur
 1933 : Trois Balles dans la peau
 1933 : Le Coucher de la mariée

External links 

French film directors
20th-century French screenwriters
People from Troyes
1882 births
1934 deaths